The 2009–10 Liga Premier de Ascenso season was split in two tournaments Apertura and Bicentenario. Liga Premier was the third-tier football league of Mexico. The season was played between 22 August 2009 and 16 May 2010.

Teams

Group 1 
{{Location map+ |Mexico |width=700|float=right |caption=Location of teams in the 2009–10 LPA Group 1 |places=

Group 2

Group 3

Torneo Apertura

Regular season

Group 1

League table

Results

Group 2

League table

Results

Group 3

League table

Results

Inter–groups matches
In the Apertura 2009 and Bicentenario 2010 tournaments, the league determined the celebration of two weeks of matches between teams belonging to different groups.

Week 1

 Atlético San Francisco 0–1 Chivas Rayadas
 Potros UAEM 0–0 Celaya
 Cuautitlán 0–0 Zorros de Reynosa
 Bravos 0–3 Dorados UACH
 Búhos de Hermosillo 0–0 Unión de Curtidores
 América Manzanillo 3–2 Atlético Tapatío
 Pumas Naucalpan 1–0 Excélsior
 Cruz Azul Jasso 1–1 Deportivo Guamúchil
 Tecamachalco 1–1 Vaqueros
 Albinegros de Orizaba 0–0 La Piedad

 Ocelotes UNACH 4–2 Atlético San Juan
 Real Saltillo Soccer 2–0 Delfines de Los Cabos
 ECA Norte 2–3 Altamira
 Inter Playa del Carmen 0–0 Tampico Madero
 Guerreros de Acapulco 3–1 Loros UdeC
 Universidad del Fútbol 5–1 Toros de Zacatecas
 Irapuato 0–1 Cachorros UdeG
 Petroleros de Salamanca 1–1 Dorados Los Mochis
 TR Córdoba 3–2 Querétaro

Week 2

 Vaqueros 2–1 Pumas Naucalpan
 Atlético San Francisco 2–1 Ocelotes UNACH
 Petroleros de Salamanca 0–1 TR Córdoba
 Querétaro 1–2 Toros de Zacatecas
 Búhos de Hermosillo 2–1 La Piedad
 Bravo 2–0 Albinegros de Orizaba
 América Manzanillo 1–0 Tecamachalco
 Cachorros UdeG 1–0 Excélsior
 Atlético San Juan 0–2 Guerreros de Acapulco
 Atlético Tapatío 1–1 Altamira

 Zorros de Reynosa 2–2 Potros UAEM
 Delfines de Los Cabos 1–2 Universidad del Fútbol
 Dorados Los Mochis 1–0 Celaya
 Loros UdeC 4–1 Cruz Azul Jasso
 Deportivo Guamúchil 4–1 Unión de Curtidores
 Chivas Rayadas 4–1 Cuautitlán
 Irapuato 1–0 Inter Playa del Carmen
 Tampico Madero 8–0 ECA Norte
 Dorados UACH 1–0 Real Saltillo Soccer

Liguilla
The fifth or sixth best teams of each group play two games against each other on a home-and-away basis. The higher seeded teams play on their home field during the second leg. The winner of each match up is determined by aggregate score. In the Round of 8, quarterfinals and semifinals, if the two teams are tied on aggregate the higher seeded team advances. In the final, if the two teams are tied after both legs, the match goes to extra time and, if necessary, a penalty shoot-out.

Round of 16

First leg

Second leg

Quarter-finals

First leg

Second leg

Semi-finals

First leg

Second leg

Final

First leg

Second leg

Torneo Bicentenario

Changes
 Atlético San Francisco was disenrolled and dissolved after Apertura 2009 tournament.

Regular season

Group 1

League table

Results

Group 2

League table

Results

Group 3

League table

Results

Inter–group matches

Week 1

 Querétaro 2–2 TR Córdoba
 Altamira 3–0 ECA Norte
 Loros UdeC 2–0 Guerreros de Acapulco
 Dorados UACH 3–3 Bravos
 Vaqueros 1–0 Tecamachalco
 Unión de Curtidores 3–4 Búhos de Hermosillo
 Excélsior 0–1 Pumas Naucalpan
 Cachorros UdeG 0–1 Irapuato
 Atlético San Juan 0–1 Ocelotes UNACH

 Dorados Los Mochis 1–0 Petroleros de Salamanca
 Delfines de Los Cabos 0–2 Real Saltillo Soccer
 Zorros de Reynosa 1–0 Cuautitlán
 Atlético Tapatío 1–5 América Manzanillo
 Toros de Zacatecas 0–3 Universidad del Fútbol
 Celaya 0–0 Potros UAEM
 Deportivo Guamúchil 0–0 Cruz Azul Jasso
 Tampico Madero 1–1 Inter Playa del Carmen
 La Piedad 2–1 Albinegros de Orizaba

Week 2

 Tecamachalco 2–1 América Manzanillo
 Altamira 5–1 Atlético Tapatío
 Unión de Curtidores 0–1 Deportivo Guamúchil
 Guerreros de Acapulco 2–0 Atlético San Juan
 Potros UAEM 5–0 Zorros de Reynosa
 Cruz Azul Jasso 2–2 Loros UdeC
 Excélsior 1–2 Cachorros UdeG
 ECA Norte 0–2 Tampico Madero
 Inter Playa del Carmen 1–0 Irapuato

 Real Saltillo Soccer 0–0 Dorados UACH
 Pumas Naucalpan 2–0 Vaqueros
 Toros de Zacatecas 0–0 Querétaro
 Celaya 3–1 Dorados Los Mochis
 Albinegros de Orizaba 2–0 Bravos
 Universidad del Fútbol 1–0 Delfines de Los Cabos
 TR Córdoba 2–0 Petroleros de Salamanca
 Cuautitlán 0–2 Chivas Rayadas
 La Piedad 2–2 Búhos de Hermosillo

Liguilla
The fifth or sixth best teams of each group play two games against each other on a home-and-away basis. The higher seeded teams play on their home field during the second leg. The winner of each match up is determined by aggregate score. In the Round of 8, quarterfinals and semifinals, if the two teams are tied on aggregate the higher seeded team advances. In the final, if the two teams are tied after both legs, the match goes to extra time and, if necessary, a penalty shoot-out.

Round of 16

First leg

Second leg

Quarter-finals

First leg

Second leg

Semi-finals

First leg

Second leg

Final

First leg

Second leg

Relegation Table

Promotion to Liga de Ascenso
Universidad del Fútbol won the two tournaments corresponding to the season, however, due to being a reserve team of C.F. Pachuca, it did not have the right to be promoted. By regulation, the place in the upper category was offered to Altamira F.C., the team with the second best performance in the season, so this club finally won the promotion after paying US$ 470,000 for the place.

See also 
2009–10 Mexican Primera División season
2009–10 Liga de Ascenso season
2009–10 Liga de Nuevos Talentos season

References

External links 
 Official website of Liga Premier
 Magazine page  

 
1